Oleispira is a psychrophilic bacteria genus from the family of Oceanospirillaceae.

References

Further reading 
 
 
 
 

Oceanospirillales
Psychrophiles
Bacteria genera